Bastard toadflax or bastard-toadflax is a common name for a plant which may refer to:
Comandra
Thesium humifusum